Francis Kerschner Myers (March 7, 1874 – August 2, 1940) was a United States district judge of the United States District Court for the Eastern District of South Carolina.

Education and career

Born in Wilmington, North Carolina, Myers read law to enter the bar in 1896. He was in private practice in Charleston, South Carolina from 1896 to 1908. He was a law clerk and court reporter for the Charleston Circuit Court from 1898 to 1908. He was a master in equity for the Charleston County Court of Equity from 1908 to 1934.

Federal judicial service

On June 6, 1934, Myers was nominated by President Franklin D. Roosevelt to a seat on the United States District Court for the Eastern District of South Carolina vacated by Judge Ernest Ford Cochran. Myers was confirmed by the United States Senate on June 9, 1934, and received his commission on June 14, 1934. Myers served in that capacity until his death on August 2, 1940.

References

Sources
 

1874 births
1940 deaths
Judges of the United States District Court for the Eastern District of South Carolina
United States district court judges appointed by Franklin D. Roosevelt
20th-century American judges
United States federal judges admitted to the practice of law by reading law